Urtea graeca is a species of beetles in the family Lymexylidae, the only species in the genus Urtea.

References

Lymexylidae
Cucujoidea genera